The 1938 Nebraska gubernatorial election was held on November 8, 1938, and featured incumbent Governor Robert L. Cochran, a Democrat, defeating Republican nominee, Speaker of the state legislature Charles J. Warner, as well as former Democratic Governor Charles W. Bryan, who ran as an Independent, to win a third and final two-year term in office.

Democratic primary

Candidates
Fred W. Bartzatt
Robert L. Cochran, incumbent Governor
Samuel Freeman
Franz C. Radke, former member of the Nebraska Legislature, Johnson County Judge, Tecumseh City Attorney, and general counsel of the state Department of Banking
William H. Swanson

Results

Republican primary

Candidates
Kenneth H. Gedney, architect
Robert G. Ross
Vernon R. Thomas
Charles J. Warner, Speaker of the Nebraska Legislature

Results

General election

Results

References

Gubernatorial
1938
Nebraska
November 1938 events